Dialogue de l'ombre double (Dialogue of the double shadow) is a mixed work by Pierre Boulez for clarinet and electroacoustic device composed in 1985. The play is dedicated to Luciano Berio for his sixtieth birthday. There exists a version for bassoon, for saxophone, for traverse flute and for recorder, each made by the performer themself.

Dialogue de l'ombre double is based on the scene "double shadow" of Paul Claudel's 11-hour play The Satin Slipper. The clarinetist dialogues with his/her shadow, represented by a part of clarinet pre-recorded on magnetic tape and spatialized by means of loudspeakers dispersed around the audience.

The work was premiered on October 28, 1985, in Florence by Alain Damiens.

The performance lasts about 15 to 20 minutes.

References

External links 
 Dialogue de l'ombre double, Bibliothèque nationale de France
 , Alain Damiens, Salzburg Festival 1992

Compositions by Pierre Boulez
Solo clarinet pieces
1985 compositions
Spatial music
Music dedicated to family or friends